The meridian 15° east of Greenwich is a line of longitude that extends from the North Pole across the Arctic Ocean, Europe, Africa, the Atlantic Ocean, the Southern Ocean, and Antarctica to the South Pole.

The 15th meridian east forms a great circle with the 165th meridian west.

The meridian is the central axis of time zones with the UTC+01:00 offset, including Central European Time and West Africa Time.

From Pole to Pole
Starting at the North Pole and heading south to the South Pole, the 15th meridian east passes through:

{| class="wikitable plainrowheaders"
! scope="col" width="125" | Co-ordinates
! scope="col" | Country, territory or sea
! scope="col" | Notes
|-
| style="background:#b0e0e6;" | 
! scope="row" style="background:#b0e0e6;" | Arctic Ocean
| style="background:#b0e0e6;" |
|-
| 
! scope="row" | 
| Island of Spitsbergen, Svalbard
|-valign="top"
| style="background:#b0e0e6;" | 
! scope="row" style="background:#b0e0e6;" | Atlantic Ocean
| style="background:#b0e0e6;" | Greenland Sea Norwegian Sea
|-
| 
! scope="row" | 
| Islands of Langøya, Austvågøy and Hinnøya
|-
| style="background:#b0e0e6;" | 
! scope="row" style="background:#b0e0e6;" | Vestfjorden
| style="background:#b0e0e6;" |
|-
| 
! scope="row" | 
| Island of Engeløya and the mainland
|-
| 
! scope="row" | 
| for about 1111 km
|-
| style="background:#b0e0e6;" | 
! scope="row" style="background:#b0e0e6;" | Baltic Sea
| style="background:#b0e0e6;" |
|-
| 
! scope="row" | 
| Island of Bornholm, for about 21 km. There is a small memorial at 
|-
| style="background:#b0e0e6;" | 
! scope="row" style="background:#b0e0e6;" | Baltic Sea
| style="background:#b0e0e6;" |
|-
| 
! scope="row" | 
|
|-
| 
! scope="row" | 
| For about 17 km between Rothenburg and Görlitz.
|-
| 
! scope="row" | 
| For 1500 m in Zgorzelec.
|-
| 
! scope="row" | 
| For 300 m in Görlitz.
|-
| 
! scope="row" | 
|
|-
| 
! scope="row" | 
| For about 3 km
|-
| 
! scope="row" | 
| For about 6 km
|-valign="top"
| 
! scope="row" | 
| A mark in the pavement is found in Jindřichův Hradec, but the precise place is 100m to the West.
|-
| 
! scope="row" | 
|
|-valign="top"
| 
! scope="row" | 
|
|-valign="top"
| 
! scope="row" | 
|
|-valign="top"
| 
! scope="row" | 
| Almost corresponds to the middle line of the country in the direction west-east. A memorial has been set up in the village of Vrhtrebnje.
|-
| 
! scope="row" | 
| Mainland, and the islands of Pag, Sestrunj and Dugi otok
|-
| style="background:#b0e0e6;" | 
! scope="row" style="background:#b0e0e6;" | Mediterranean Sea
| style="background:#b0e0e6;" | Adriatic Sea
|-
| 
! scope="row" | 
|On the beach of Termoli; a 7-metre monument marks the  point
|-
| style="background:#b0e0e6;" | 
! scope="row" style="background:#b0e0e6;" | Mediterranean Sea
| style="background:#b0e0e6;" | Tyrrhenian Sea
|-
| 
! scope="row" | 
| Island of Vulcano
|-
| style="background:#b0e0e6;" | 
! scope="row" style="background:#b0e0e6;" | Mediterranean Sea
| style="background:#b0e0e6;" | Tyrrhenian Sea
|-
| 
! scope="row" | 
| Island of Sicily, across the Etna volcano
|-
| style="background:#b0e0e6;" | 
! scope="row" style="background:#b0e0e6;" | Mediterranean Sea
| style="background:#b0e0e6;" |
|-
| 
! scope="row" | 
|
|-valign="top"
| 
! scope="row" | 
| For about 1 km - the meridian just passes through the country's most north-westerly point
|-
| 
! scope="row" | 
|
|-valign="top"
| 
! scope="row" | 
| Passing through Lake Chad Passing just west of N'Djamena
|-
| 
! scope="row" | 
|
|-
| 
! scope="row" | 
|
|-
| 
! scope="row" | 
|
|-
| 
! scope="row" | 
|
|-
| 
! scope="row" | 
|
|-
| 
! scope="row" | 
|
|-
| 
! scope="row" | 
|
|-
| 
! scope="row" | 
|
|-
| 
! scope="row" | 
|
|-
| style="background:#b0e0e6;" | 
! scope="row" style="background:#b0e0e6;" | Atlantic Ocean
| style="background:#b0e0e6;" |
|-
| style="background:#b0e0e6;" | 
! scope="row" style="background:#b0e0e6;" | Southern Ocean
| style="background:#b0e0e6;" |
|-
| 
! scope="row" | Antarctica
| Queen Maud Land, claimed by 

|-
|}

References

See also
14th meridian east
16th meridian east

e015th meridian east